Juri Kawano (born 16 December 1996) is a Japanese professional footballer who plays as a forward for WE League club Chifure AS Elfen Saitama.

Club career 
Kawano made her WE League debut on 20 September 2021.

References 

WE League players
Living people
1996 births
Japanese women's footballers
Women's association football forwards
Association football people from Kanagawa Prefecture
Chifure AS Elfen Saitama players